Bobby Hollander (April 20, 1929 – March 7, 2002) was an American adult film director, performer, and magazine publisher. He directed 59 pornographic movies between 1979 and 1995. He was one of the pioneers of the shot-on-video porn movie. Hollander was most famous for discovering and managing porn superstar Shauna Grant. He is a member of the XRCO Hall of Fame.

Pornographic film career

Born Ira Allen Sachs to a Jewish family in Brooklyn, Hollander entered the pornography industry in 1970, appearing in loops.

According to a March 14, 1988 article in People, Hollander gave Colleen Applegate her stage name Shauna Grant, and in the fall of 1982 began managing her career. Over the next year, Grant made 30 X-rated movies. She eventually left Hollander for different management and committed suicide in 1984.

Robbed by John Holmes
In King Dong, Hollander describes being introduced to fellow pornographic actor John Holmes, at the home Hollander shared in Burbank, and leaving briefly the next day to find John had robbed Hollander's house:

Illness and death
He died on March 7, 2002, at the Veterans Affairs hospital in Los Angeles, California from a brain tumor. At the time of his death, Hollander was separated from his wife Gloria Leonard.

References

External links 
 
 
 

2002 deaths
1929 births
Adult magazine publishers (people)
American magazine founders
American male pornographic film actors
American pornographic film directors
Deaths from cancer in California
Neurological disease deaths in California
Deaths from brain cancer in the United States
People from Brooklyn
Pornographic film actors from New York (state)
Film directors from New York City
20th-century American male actors